Jason Polakow (born 10 November 1971 in Torquay, Victoria) is an Australian professional windsurfer from Victoria.
Polakow gained notoriety in 1991 when we won the Marui/O’Neill World Cup Grand Slam  contest against Robby Naish becoming the first non-Hawaiian ever to win a World Cup Wave contest in Hawaii.
 Polakow won the PWA World Tour wave world title in 1997 and 1998.

References 

1971 births
Australian windsurfers
Living people
Sportsmen from Victoria (Australia)